The Artemisa Formation is a geologic formation in western Cuba. It preserves mainly ammonite fossils dating back to the Late Oxfordian to Tithonian period. The formation is divided into two members; La Zarza and Sumidero Members. Most of the formation was deposited in deeper marine conditions.

See also 
 List of fossiliferous stratigraphic units in Cuba

References

Bibliography

Further reading 
 
 R. Myczynski. 1989. Ammonite biostratigraphy of the Tithonian of Western Cuba. Annales Societatis Geologorum Poloniae 59:43-125

Geologic formations of Cuba
Jurassic Cuba
Shale formations
Limestone formations
Open marine deposits
Formations
Formations